KLAD (960 AM, "ESPN 960 & 104.3") is a radio station licensed to serve Klamath Falls, Oregon, United States.  The station, which began broadcasting in 1955, is currently owned by Basin Mediactive, LLC.

Programming
KLAD broadcasts a sports format including local and nationally syndicated programs, some sourced from ESPN Radio. The station broadcasts network sports updates every hour, with local sports updates every hour from 6:00 AM to 7:00 PM weekdays.

History

Launch on 900
This station launched in September 1955, broadcasting on a frequency of 900 kHz with 1,000 watts of power, daytime-only, as KLAD.  Original licensee K-Lad Broadcasters was co-owned by C.E. Wilson, Phil Jackson, and Bill Hansen.

Move to 960
The station was sold to the similarly named KLAD Broadcasters in a transaction that was consummated on April 7, 1958. In 1959, the station moved to the current 960 kHz frequency and upgraded to 5,000 watts of power although it was still restricted to daytime-only operation.  KLAD was acquired by Ogden Knapp, who also began serving as president and general manager of the station, on April 3, 1961.

Control of KLAD was passed to 960 Radio, Inc., owned by Cyrus L. Smith and his family, on August 1, 1969. In late 1971, the FCC granted the station a construction permit to add nighttime service at 5,000 watts of power, albeit using a directional antenna array to prevent interference with other stations. KLAD broadcast a country & western music format throughout the 1970s.

The 1980s
In February 1986, 960 Radio, Inc., reached an agreement to sell this station to Lost River Broadcasting, Inc.  The deal was approved by the FCC on March 25, 1986, but the transaction was never consummated and control of KLAD remained with 960 Radio, Inc. On January 1, 1987, the station dropped its original KLAD call sign for KLKL.

Just over a year later, on March 3, 1988, the station returned to its original KLAD call sign.  A few weeks later in March 1988, 960 Radio, Inc., reached a new agreement to sell this station, this time, to Todd Communications, Inc.  The deal was approved by the FCC on May 11, 1988, and the transaction was consummated on May 13, 1988.

The 1990s

In February 1990, Todd Communications, Inc., reached an agreement to sell this station to B&B Broadcasting, Inc.  The deal was approved by the FCC on April 18, 1990, and the transaction was consummated on June 1, 1990.

In August 1998, B&B Broadcasting, Inc., reached an agreement to sell this station to New Northwest Broadcasters, Inc., as part of a six-station deal valued at $7.9 million. The deal was approved by the FCC on October 20, 1998, and the transaction was consummated on December 10, 1998. The station applied for a new callsign and the FCC assigned it KKJX on January 12, 2000.  KKJX began broadcasting a sports talk format branded as "ESPN 960" in that carried nothing by ESPN Radio programming. This proved short-lived as in February 2001, KKJX flipped formats to broadcast a Spanish-language syndicated music format known as "La Maquina Musical".

Through 2011

As part of an internal corporate reorganization, New Northwest Broadcasters, Inc., applied to the FCC to transfer the broadcast license for KLAD to New Northwest Broadcasters, LLC.  The transfer was approved by the FCC on June 22, 2000, and the transaction was consummated on July 31, 2000.

The station was most recently reassigned the heritage KLAD call sign by the FCC on June 20, 2007. With the return to KLAD, the station also returned to its heritage country music format playing nothing but classic country.

New Northwest Broadcasters encountered financial difficulties and in May 2010 the station group was forced into receivership by order of the Superior Court for King County, Washington. More than 30 broadcast licenses were transferred to Revitalization Partners, LLC, acting as general receiver. After overcoming certain legal objections by creditors, a number of the stations were sold to new owners. KLAD plus sister stations KAGO, KAGO-FM, KLAD-FM, and KYSF were sold to Basin Mediactive, LLC, in February 2011. The sale gained FCC approval on April 7, 2011, and the transaction was formally consummated on May 1, 2011.

Return to sports

On August 15, 2011, "Country Legends 960" changed formats to "960 the Sports Legend" becoming the Klamath Basin's only all-sports station.  "960 the Sports Legend" featured national sports talk hosts Dan Patrick and Jim Rome.  Local sports personality Ryan Goff, with more than a decade of Oregon sports experience, provides local play-by-play broadcasts, weekday local & regional sports updates, and a local sports talk show. Goff moved away in late 2013.  Leaving the reins to Matthew Bagley.  Matthew continues the traditions of Goff with the "Les Schwab Tires/ Bi-Mart Game of the Week" For high school football.  Bagley also airs Klamath Union Basketball and Baseball.  In early 2014 the station added another play by play broadcaster, Cooper Roberts.  He is now the "Voice of Klamath Union High School".  Broadcasting all Klamath Union Football, Basketball and Baseball competitions. Matthew left KLAD in 2016. Mike Spataro was promoted to Sports Director and served for a few months before moving back to Colorado to be closer to family. In November 2016, Cooper was promoted to Sports Director where he currently serves.

KLAD exclusively airs live broadcasts of the Oregon State Beavers football, Oregon Tech Lady Owls basketball, Seattle Seahawks, NFL football including the Super Bowl, and Klamath Falls Gems baseball in addition to Klamath Union Athletics KLAD is unmatched in local & regional sports coverage.  In total, over 200 play-by-play broadcasts are scheduled each year.

In late 2013 KLAD Added on FM Feed to accompany the AM 960 Feed on 93.3FM.
In February 2014 KLAD switched affiliations from Fox Sports Radio to ESPN Radio and rebranded as "ESPN 960".

In the summer of 2015, the station, along with its sister station "News Talk 1150 KAGO AM" carried the 16-18 year old Babe Ruth World Series that was held at Kiger Stadium.  Matthew Bagley, along with Cooper Roberts, Mike Garrard, Bobby Tohmpson.  And other area broadcasters teamed up to bring every game to the radio.  The World Series will return to Klamath Falls in 2017.

KLAD began carrying "The Bald Faced Truth" with John Canzano from 12-3p, a syndicated sports show that originates in Portland, OR, in 2017. Canzano is the sports columnist at The Oregonian.

Current staff includes:

Cooper Roberts- Director

Mike Garrard- Sports Caster

Bobby Thompson- Sports Caster

Damien Johnson- Board Operator

References

External links

FCC History Cards for KLAD

LAD
Sports radio stations in the United States
Radio stations established in 1955
Klamath County, Oregon
1955 establishments in Oregon